The 1848 Vermont gubernatorial election took place on September 5, 1848, and resulted in the election of Whig Party candidate Carlos Coolidge to a one-year term as governor.

Results

References

1848
Vermont
Gubernatorial
September 1848 events